The Evelyn Richardson Memorial Non-Fiction Award is a Canadian literary award, presented annually by the Atlantic Book Awards & Festival, to the best work of adult non-fiction published in the previous year by a writer from Atlantic Canada. It is the oldest literary award in the region and is considered the most prestigious for a work of non-fiction. The award was named to honour Evelyn M. Richardson.

Winners
1978 - Harry Bruce, Lifeline: the Story of the Atlantic Ferries and Coastal Boats
1979 - Alden Nowlan, Double Exposure
1980 - Joan Payzant and L.J. Payzant, Like a Weaver's Shuttle: a history of the Halifax-Dartmouth ferries
1981 - Kay Hill, Joe Howe: the Man who was Nova Scotia
1982 - Bruce Armstrong, Sable Island
1983 - J. Murray Beck, Joseph Howe: Volume 1, Conservative Reformer, 1804-1848
1984 - Brian C. Cuthbertson, The Loyalist Governor: Biography of Sir John Wentworth
1985 - Lilias M. Toward, Mabel Bell: Alexander's Silent Partner
1986 - P. B. Waite, The Man from Halifax: Sir John Thompson, Prime Minister
1987 - Tony Foster, Meeting of Generals
1988 - Harold Horwood, Dancing on the Shore: a Celebration of Life at Annapolis Basin
1989 - Dean Jobb, Shades of Justice: Seven Nova Scotia Murder Cases
1990 - Judith Fingard, Dark Side of Life in Victorian Halifax
1991 - Harry Thurston, Tidal Life: a natural history of the Bay of Fundy
1992 - Robert Pope, Illness and Healing: Images of  Cancer
1993 - Sally Ross and Alphonse Deveau, The Acadians of Nova Scotia: Past and Present
1994 - Peter Brock, Variations on a Planet
1995 - Elizabeth Pacey, Landmarks: Historic Buildings of Nova Scotia
1996 - Simone Poirier-Bures, That Shining Place
1997 - Harry Thurston, The Nature of Shorebirds: Nomads of the Wetlands
1998 - Harry Bruce, An Illustrated History of Nova Scotia
1999 - Silver Donald Cameron, The Living Beach
2000 - Robin Metcalfe, Studio Rally
2001 - Joan Baxter, A Serious Pair of Shoes: An African Journal
2002 - Kent Thompson, Getting Out of Town by Book and Bike
2003 - Stephen Kimber, Sailors, Slackers and Blind Pigs: Halifax at War
2004 - Harry Thurston, Island of the Blessed: the Secrets of Egypt's Everlasting Oasis
2005 - Marq de Villiers and Sheila Hirtle, A Dune Adrift
2006 - Linda Johns, Birds of a Feather: Tales of a Wild Bird Haven
2007 - Linden MacIntyre, Causeway: A Passage from Innocence
2008 - Marq de Villiers, The Witch in the Wind: The True Story of the Legendary Bluenose
2009 - William B. Naftel, Halifax at War: Searchlights, Squadrons, and Submarines 1939-1945
2010 - John DeMont, Coal Black Heart: The Story of Coal and the Lives it Ruled
2011 - Laura Penny, More Money Than Brains: Why Schools Suck, College is Crap, and Idiots Think They're Right
2012 - Harry Thurston, The Atlantic Coast: A Natural History
2013 - Steven Laffoley, Shadowboxing: The Rise and Fall of George Dixon
2014 - Stephen Kimber, What Lies Across the Water
2015 - Kaleigh Trace, Hot, Wet, & Shaking: How I Learned to Talk About Sex
2016 - Gary Saunders, My Life With Trees
2017 - Erin Wunker, Notes from A Feminist Killjoy
2018 - John DeMont, The Long Way Home: A Personal History of Nova Scotia 
2019 - Kate Inglis, Notes for the Everlost: A Field Guide to Grief
2020 - Ami McKay, Daughter of Family G: A Memoir of Cancer Genes, Love and Fate
2021 - Tyler LeBlanc, Acadian Driftwood: One Family and the Great Expulsion

References

External links
 Evelyn Richardson Memorial Award

Awards established in 1978
1978 establishments in Nova Scotia
Atlantic Book Awards
Canadian non-fiction literary awards